Cochylimorpha monstrabilis is a species of moth of the family Tortricidae. It is found in Mongolia.

Its specific name monstrābilis means ‘remarkable, noteworthy’, 

References

Moths described in 1970
Cochylimorpha
Taxa named by Józef Razowski
Moths of Asia